Wacław Kuźmicki (April 27, 1921 – August 19, 2013) was a Polish decathlete who competed at the 1948 Summer Olympics in London, where he finished 16th in a field of 35 competitors. He was born in Osiedle Bacieczki, Białystok and attended the Warsaw School of Economics from 1945-1949. During that time he participated in the 1946 European Athletics Championships in Oslo, finishing 10th among 16 athletes, as well as the 1947 and 1949 editions of the World Student Games, winning the long jump event at the earlier tournament. By the time of his 1953 retirement he had been the Polish national pentathlon champion twice (1947 and 1950) and the national triple jump champion once (1947). Following his retirement from active competition, due to injuries, he took up coaching, working for several clubs as well as the national team. He also served as a judge for international athletic competitions and, for his service in this field, was made a member of the Order of Polonia Restituta, Knight's Cross. He was married to fellow athlete Irene Hejducka until her death in 2008 and lived in Katowice until his own death. He was the last surviving member of the Polish delegation to the 1948 Summer Olympics.

References

1921 births
2013 deaths
Polish decathletes
Polish athletics coaches
Athletes (track and field) at the 1948 Summer Olympics
Olympic athletes of Poland
Sportspeople from Białystok
Jagiellonia Białystok athletes